15 Exitos Rancheros is a compilation album by Al Hurricane, Al Hurricane, Jr., & Tiny Morrie. It is the thirteenth full-length album released by the New Mexican musician Al Hurricane in 1980.

Track listing

References

Al Hurricane albums
New Mexico music albums